Elaphidion unispinosum is a species of beetle in the family Cerambycidae and tribe Elaphidiini. It was described by Fisher in 1942.

References

unispinosum
Beetles described in 1942